The Fight to Save Juárez: Life in the Heart of Mexico's Drug War is a 2013 book by Ricardo C. Ainslie, a professor at the University of Texas at Austin. It is published by the University of Texas Press and documents the Mexican Drug War in Ciudad Juárez in the years 2008-2010.

Synopsis
Mayor of Juárez Jose Reyes Ferriz is a central figure in the book. He, along with newspaper reporter Raymundo Ruiz, human rights ombudsman Gustavo de la Rosa, and a mistress named "Elena" are four major sources. Interviews from these sources and others were used in the book. The Villas de Salvárcar massacre is described in this book.

Author's background
The author has dual U.S.-Mexican citizenship and is a filmmaker. He also works at the University of Texas at Austin as a professor of educational psychology. Ainslie was able to connect with not only regular people but also politicians and activists as part of his research.

Reception

Candace E. Griffith of West Virginia University wrote that the book can cater to a wide audience, from politicians to ordinary people.

Kirkus Reviews concluded that the book is "A hard-nosed, cleareyed analysis of a legacy of institutionalized corruption and its dire consequences for human lives."

Publishers Weekly stated "Although not easy to read, this is an important work for any reader concerned about Mexico."

References

Notes

External links
 The Fight to Save Juárez - University of Texas Press
 Interview of Ricardo C. Ainslie at Kirkus Reviews

2013 non-fiction books
Works about Mexican drug cartels
University of Texas Press books
Books about Mexico